Mulberry Creek may refer to a waterway in the United States:

 Mulberry Creek (Alabama River), a tributary of the Alabama River in Alabama
 Mulberry Creek (Tennessee River), a tributary of the Tennessee River in Alabama
 Mulberry River (Arkansas), a tributary of the Arkansas River, alternately named "Mulberry Creek"
 Mulberry Creek (Chattahoochee River tributary), a stream in Georgia
 Mulberry Creek (Current River), a stream in Missouri
 Mulberry Creek (Marais des Cygnes River), a stream in Missouri
 Mulberry Creek (Red River), a tributary of the Red River in Texas

See also 
 Mulberry River (disambiguation)